David Eggby, A.C.S. (born 1950) is an English-born Australian cinematographer.

Eggby was born in 1950 in London, but has lived in Melbourne since childhood. He received the Cinematographer of the Year Award (2001) and the Golden Tripod from the Australian Cinematographers Society, both for his work on the film Pitch Black.

Beginning his career as a photographer for the Royal Australian Navy, Eggby then moved on to work for Australian television production company Crawford Productions, working on such shows as Homicide and Matlock Police. Eggby's lucky break would be the low budget action film Mad Max. Often risking personal injury, Eggby would perch himself onto the back of a speeding motorbike to achieve adrenaline-pumping shots for the cult favourite.

Filmography

Film

Television 
TV series

Miniseries

TV movies

References

External links 

1950 births
Living people
Australian cinematographers